Carpatolechia daehania is a moth of the family Gelechiidae. It is found in South Korea and Japan.

The wingspan is 11.5–13 mm. The forewings are dark brown, with a creamy white semi-ovate patch developed beyond the basal dark fascia, with a well-developed white scale-tuft at the anterior margin and two dark fuscous scale-tufts along the posterior margin. Another two to three scale-tufts are found obliquely near the middle and there are usually two tufts at the end of the cell. The hindwings are grey.

References

Moths described in 1993
Carpatolechia
Moths of Korea
Moths of Japan